

The Oberursel U.I was an early German aircraft engine that powered many German fighter aircraft in the first part of World War I. It was a 9-cylinder air-cooled rotary engine, a licence-built copy of the Gnome Delta that Oberursel was producing under licence before the war. It produced 75 kW (100 hp).

Applications
 AGO DV.3
 Euler D.I
 Euler D.II
 Feiro Dongó
 Fokker D.II
 Fokker D.V
 Fokker E.II
 Fokker E.III
 Gotha LD 5
 Pfalz A.II
 Pfalz E.II
 Pfalz E.III
 Pfalz E.VI
 Siemens-Schuckert E.III

References

1910s aircraft piston engines
Rotary aircraft piston engines